Melville Island (Tiwi: Yermalner) is an island in the eastern Timor Sea, off the coast of the Northern Territory, Australia. Along with Bathurst Island and nine smaller uninhabited islands, it forms part of the group known as the Tiwi Islands, which are under the jurisdiction of the Northern Territory in association with the Tiwi Land Council as the regional authority.

History

Indigenous people have occupied the area that became the Tiwi Islands for at least 40,000 years. It is said that the first European to sight the island was Abel Tasman in 1644.

Explorer Phillip Parker King (son of governor of New South Wales Philip Gidley King) named it for Robert Dundas, 2nd Viscount Melville, first Lord of the Admiralty, who is also commemorated by the much larger Melville Island in the Canadian Arctic Archipelago. Shortly after this, the British made the first attempt to settle Australia's north coast, at the short-lived Fort Dundas on Melville Island. The settlement lasted from 1824 to 1828.

There was a Catholic mission on the island, on which Nova Peris' mother was raised after being taken from her mother.

During World War II the small Snake Bay Patrol manned by local Tiwi people was established as part of the military forces deployed to protect the island against any Japanese landings.

Geography and climate
At , it is just outside the 100 largest islands in the world, but is the second biggest island of Australia after Tasmania. The islands have a tropical climate.

Population
The largest settlement on the island is Milikapiti, with a population of 559. About 30 more people live in five family outstations.

Governance
As part of the Tiwi Islands, Melville is under the jurisdiction of the Northern Territory, with the Tiwi Land Council as the regional authority.

References

Further reading

 - This was an institution where girls were taken from their families on the mainland, in one example of the Stolen Generations.

External links
 Tiwi Land Council
 Tiwi Art
 Tourist Information

Tiwi Islands